Alistair "Ally" Millar (born 15 January 1952) is a Scottish former professional footballer who played as a midfielder in the Football League for Barnsley and York City, in non-League football for Matlock Town and Worksop Town, in Scottish junior football for Benburb, and in the United States for Phoenix Inferno and Baltimore Blast.

References

1952 births
Living people
Footballers from Glasgow
Scottish footballers
Association football midfielders
Benburb F.C. players
Barnsley F.C. players
York City F.C. players
Phoenix Inferno players
Baltimore Blast (1980–1992) players
Matlock Town F.C. players
Worksop Town F.C. players
English Football League players
Hamilton Academical F.C. players
Scottish Football League players
Scottish expatriate footballers
Expatriate soccer players in the United States
Scottish expatriate sportspeople in the United States